Matt Ian Gilbert (born 10 September 1985) is an English rugby union footballer currently playing at Flanker and number eight for Cinderford. He previously played for Hartpury University, Bath and  Worcester Warriors.  As well as Llanelli Scarlets in the Pro 14 and European Cup.

He is the only deaf professional sportsman in England. Mat has worn hearing aids Since he was a child, and now wears Phonak aids. He works as a celebrity ambassador for Phonak,  as well as an ambassador for the charity, Action on Hearing Loss helping to raise awareness of hearing loss.

He has played 11 times for the England Deaf rugby team - www.englanddeafrugby.com

References

External links
 Scarlets Profile
 Profile & Statistics on ESPN Scrum

1985 births
Living people
Rugby union players from Sidcup
English rugby union players
Scarlets players
Bath Rugby players
People educated at the Duke of York's Royal Military School
Rugby union flankers